Mchochaeo is a small island of Palau.

See also

 Desert island
 List of islands

References

Uninhabited islands of Palau